Geoffrey Holden (18 August 1916 – 6 April 1992) was a British painter. His work was part of the painting event in the art competition at the 1948 Summer Olympics.

References

1916 births
1992 deaths
20th-century British painters
British male painters
Olympic competitors in art competitions
People from Cheltenham
20th-century British male artists